Old Manse is a historic building at Miami University (Oxford, Ohio). Once nicknamed the “Coffee Mill House,”  
Old Manse originally served as a residential estate and then as a manse for pastors. It later became a center for Presbyterian students and was sold by Oxford Presbyterian Church (USA) to become Miami University property in 1973.
From 2012 to 2021, it was home to the University Honors Program (now Miami University Honors College).

References

Buildings and structures of Miami University